Zhigansky District (Ecigeen uluuha) is an administrative and municipal district (raion, or ulus), one of the thirty-four in the Sakha Republic, Russia. It is located in the northern central part of the republic and borders with Bulunsky District in the north, Eveno-Bytantaysky National District in the east, Kobyaysky District in the southeast, Vilyuysky District in the southwest, and with Olenyoksky District in the northwest. Its administrative center is the rural locality (a selo) of Zhigansk. Population:  4,312 (2002 Census);  The population of Zhigansk accounts for 79.6% of the district's total population.

Geography 
The main river in the district is the Lena. Some of its important tributaries, such as the Menkere, Muna, Khoruongka, Nuora (Strekalovka) and Motorchuna, have their mouth in the area of the district. The largest lake is Lake Ulakhan-Kyuyol.

Climate

History 
The district was established on December 10, 1930.

Demographics 
As of the 1989 Census, the ethnic composition was as follows:
Evenks: 31.8%
Yakuts: 30.4%
Russians: 28.7%
Evens: 0.8%
other ethnicities: 8.2%

Inhabited localities

Divisional source:

*Administrative centers are shown in bold

References

Notes

Sources

Districts of the Sakha Republic
States and territories established in 1930